The York Buildings Company was an English company in the late 17th and early 18th centuries.

Waterworks
The full name of the company was The Governor and Company for raising the Thames Water at York Buildings. The undertaking was established in 1675 and incorporated in 1690 with a capital of £4,800, but obtained a private act in 1691 to increase its capital and enable it to buy lands. As might be expected this provided the company with a steady, but unspectacular income from the rents paid by the householders supplied with water. Water supply was its sole business until 1719.

The company was technologically advanced for its time.  It tried the steam pump of Thomas Savery, a precursor of the steam engine, though this proved a failure. In 1726, a Newcomen engine was installed at York Buildings but when the company fell into financial difficulties in 1732 the engine was broken up, cylinders being sold to the London Lead Company and Sir James Lowther. However the company continued to operate its waterworks for many years, becoming the final asset of the company, just as it was the first.  However the business had been injured as far back as 1731, by the establishment of a rival Chelsea Waterworks Company.  The works were leased out in 1746, and the lease was renewed periodically until 1818.

Forfeited estates
By 1719, procuring the incorporation of a company had become difficult, with the result that it was cheaper for speculators to buy up the patent of an existing company than to obtain a new one. In that year, its new proprietors resolved to raise a joint stock of £1,200,000 to buy forfeited and other estates in Great Britain. The new capital was immediately taken up and a 10% call was paid. This fund and borrowings then enabled the company to buy estates costing over £300,000, with a rental of £15,000. The estates purchased were estates, mainly in Scotland, forfeited after the Jacobite rising of 1715, when the rebels were stripped of their lands.
 
In January 1720, it proposed to undertake life assurance, though the Attorney-General advised them that this was ultra vires. The company's stock rose in price during the year, reaching its peak in mid August, but the threat of a writ of scire facias depressed the price, which collapsed to the point where the shares became almost unsaleable. In September, the company agreed to 'proceed only according to ancient known and regular methods, agreeable to their constitution and of the encouragement given them by Parliament'. They promised to make a call on their proprietors and did so, but gave each proprietor the option of surrendering half their stock to the company.  Most proprietors took this option, with the result that the capital was little increased. The directors were left with £675,000 of stock (10% paid) which they had difficulty in selling. The result was that the company was crippled, and had difficulty in meeting its obligations. In 1721, it raised money by conducting lotteries, the prizes including stock in the company and annuities secured on its estates.

The company undertook various ventures to exploit its estates, including mining copper and lead ores in the Panmure estates in Forfarshire, starting an ironworks at Abernethy and shipping timber from there. However these works were not profitable. It also obtained illegal advances from the Charitable Corporation.  Various financial stratagems were undertaken to enable it to stay in business.

Eventually, in 1732 its annuitants petitioned Parliament. A new court of directors was elected and supported this. A call was made on shareholders, who were given the £95,000 stock remaining in the hands of the company.  This was followed further stock manipulation. On 3 April 1732 George Robinson, the Member of Parliament for Great Marlow, was expelled from Parliament for diverting £356,000 of funds of the Charitable Corporation into buying York Buildings Company stock; the profits of the sale were given to him.

Liquidation
In 1740, the affairs of the court became subject to court proceedings, partly in the Court of Chancery and partly in Scotland. In 1756, an agreement was made as to the respective priorities of various classes of creditor for payment.  This was followed by an Act of Parliament in 1764 for the sale of the company's estates, enabling some of the debts to be paid.  The sale of further estates was authorised by another Act in 1777, the sale taking place in 1783. An agreement with creditors was made in 1786, but only led to more litigation until a further agreement was made in 1792, though this was not approved by the court until 1802. This left the company with £10,000, some government stock and its waterworks.

The waterworks had been in lease for over 50 years. It was sold in 1818 to the New River Company in exchange for an annuity of £250. The company was finally dissolved by Act of Parliament in 1829.

The estates

Among the forfeited estates handed over to the York Buildings Company were:       
Edzell Castle
Belhelvie Kirk, part of the estate of James Maule, 4th Earl of Panmure
Callendar House, Falkirk
Widdrington Castle estate of William Widdrington, 4th Baron Widdrington in Nortumberland.

See also

 John Theophilus Desaguliers.  Desaguliers advised the company on steam technology.  He was chaplain to James Brydges, 1st Duke of Chandos, one of the investors.

References

David Murray, The York Buildings Company: A Chapter in Scotch History, (reprinted by Kessinger Publishing (US) 2007)
W. R. Scott, The constitution and Finance of English, Scottish, and Irish Joint-Stock Companies to 1720 (Cambridge University Press, 1911), volume III. LCCN 12038537. .

Economic history of Great Britain
Defunct companies of the United Kingdom
Former water company predecessors of Thames Water